Isabell Roch  (born 26 July 1990) is a German female handball player for Râmnicu Vâlcea and the German national team.

She participated at the 2018 European Women's Handball Championship.

Achievements 
HBF:
Winner: 2017

References

External links

1990 births
Living people
German female handball players
People from Erlenbach am Main
Sportspeople from Lower Franconia
21st-century German women